Healdton is a city in Carter County, Oklahoma, United States. Its population was 2,788 at the 2010 census. It is part of the Ardmore micropolitan statistical area.

History 
A post office was established at Healdton, Indian Territory, on February 26, 1883.  It was named for Charles H. Heald, a prominent resident.  At the time of its founding, Healdton was located in Pickens County, Chickasaw Nation.

Geography
Healdton is located in western Carter County at  (34.231557, -97.484454). Oklahoma State Highway 76 passes through the city, leading south  to U.S. Route 70, west of Wilson and north  to Oklahoma State Highway 53.

Healdton Municipal Lake, just northeast of Healdton, boasts 7 miles of shoreline and 370 surface acres.

Geology 
The Healdton Field, encompassing Healdton and located in the western portion of Carter County, produces from the Pennsylvanian Healdton sands of the Hoxbar Group and the Ordovician massive carbonate Arbuckle Group. The field is located on the Healdton uplift, a northwest-southeast trending anticline, which formed with the Wichita Orogeny, and is 8 mi long and up to 3 mi wide. This was followed by deposition of the Healdton sandstones and shales on pre-Pennsylvanian eroded rocks and subsequent folding during the Arbuckle Orogeny. A prospector named Palmer drilled a shallow well, 425 feet, near an oil seep in the 1890s, but federal law prohibited oil development on "Indian lands" until the early 1900s. Therefore, the discovery of the field is credited to the drilling of No. 1 Wirt Franklin in 1913.

Climate

Demographics

As of the census of 2000,  2,786 people, 1,132 households, and 776 families were residing in the city. The population density was 197.4 people per square mile (76.2/km2). The 1,369 housing units had an average density of 97.0 per square mile (37.5/km2). The racial makeup of the city was 87.08% White, 0.93% African American, 7.47% Native American, 0.11% Asian, 0.90% from other races, and 3.52% from two or more races. Hispanics or Latinos of any race were 1.54% of the population.

Of the 1,132 households, 29.9% had children under 18 living with them, 54.7% were married couples living together, 10.8% had a female householder with no husband present, and 31.4% were not families. About 28.4% of all households were made up of individuals, and 15.1% had someone living alone who was 65 or older. The average household size was 2.39  and the average family size was 2.92.

In the city, the age distribution was 24.0% under 18, 9.0% from 18 to 24, 25.9% from 25 to 44, 22.8% from 45 to 64, and 18.4% who were 65 or older. The median age was 40 years. For every 100 females, there were 90.8 males. For every 100 females 18 and over, there were 88.7 males.

The median income for a household in the city was $23,550, and for a family was $29,363. Males had a median income of $25,636 versus $20,865 for females. The per capita income for the city was $12,842. About 16.8% of families and 21.5% of the population were below the poverty line, including 28.1% of those under 18 and 13.2% of those 65 or over.

Notable people
 Emmy Award-winning actress Rue McClanahan was born in Healdton.
 University of Oklahoma women's head basketball coach Sherri Coale is from Healdton.

Museums and historic buildings
The Healdton Oil Museum at 10734 Hwy 76 gives a glimpse into the oil boom days of Carter County.

The Healdton Armory at the junction of 4th and Franklin Sts. is NRHP-listed.

Medical services
Healdton is a regional medical provider, with Mercy Hospital Healdton dispensing critical-access hospital care in rural Carter, Jefferson, and Stephens Counties in southern Oklahoma.

Popular culture
The music video for Radar Bros. "Brother Rabbit" was partially shot in Healdton and directed by The General Assembly.

References

External links
 Encyclopedia of Oklahoma History and Culture - Healdton

Cities in Carter County, Oklahoma
Cities in Oklahoma
Ardmore, Oklahoma micropolitan area